Eurotiomycetes is a large class of ascomycetes with cleistothecial ascocarps within the subphylum Pezizomycotina, currently containing around 3810 species according to the Catalogue of Life. It is the third largest lichenized class, with more than 1200 lichen species that are mostly bitunicate in the formation of asci. It contains most of the fungi previously known morphologically as "Plectomycetes".

Systematics and phylogeny

Internal relationships
The class Eurotiomycetes was circumscribed in 1997 by Swedish mycologists Ove Erik Eriksson and Katarina Winka. At that time it only contained the order Eurotiales, which together with the next order added, Onygenales, form a monophyletic group comprising most of the fungi in "Plectomycetes", a group no longer in use that unified fungi under exclusively morphological characteristics.

As more orders were added to Eurotiomycetes, the first two along with Arachnomycetales became constrained to the first subclass, Eurotiomycetidae. In 2001, the second subclass, Chaetothyriomycetidae, was erected to accommodate Chaetothyriales and its sister group Verrucariales, as well as Pyrenulales since 2004. These two remain as the major subclasses of Eurotiomycetes.

The remaining subclasses were created through more phylogenetic analyses to accommodate outlying taxa or newly discovered groups: Mycocaliciomycetidae in 2007, Coryneliomycetidae  and Sclerococcomycetidae in 2016, and lastly Cryptocaliciomycetidae in 2021. The following cladogram shows the relationships between all Eurotiomycetes orders and monotypic subclasses as of 2021:

External relationships
The class Eurotiomycetes forms a clade with Lecanoromycetes, the largest lichenized class of fungi.

Taxonomy
As of 2022, the taxonomy of Eurotiomycetes recognizes 5 subclasses, 10 orders, 34 families and 289 valid genera. The families are listed here followed by the number of genera.
Subclass Chaetothyriomycetidae 
Order Chaetothyriales 
Family Chaetothyriaceae  – 19 genera
Family Coccodiniaceae  – 4 genera
Family Cyphellophoraceae  – 2 genera
Family Epibryaceae  – 1 genus
Family Herpotrichiellaceae  – 17 genera
Family Lyrommataceae  – 1 genus
Family Microtheliopsidaceae  – 1 genus
Family Paracladophialophoraceae  – 1 genus
Family Pyrenotrichaceae  – 2 genera
Family Trichomeriaceae  (=Strelitzianaceae ) – 9 genera
Chaetothyriales incertae sedis – 11 genera
Order Phaeomoniellales 
Family Celotheliaceae  (=Phaeomoniellaceae ) – 11 genera
Order Pyrenulales 
Family Pyrenulaceae  – 12 genera
Pyrenulales incertae sedis – 2 genera
Order Verrucariales 
Family Adelococcaceae  – 3 genera
Family Sarcopyreniaceae  – 1 genera
Family Verrucariaceae  – 52 genera
Verrucariales incertae sedis – 4 genera
Chaetothyriomycetidae incertae sedis
Family Rhynchostomataceae  – 2 genera
Subclass Cryptocaliciomycetidae 
Order Cryptocaliciales 
Family Cryptocaliciaceae  – 1 genus
Subclass Coryneliomycetidae 
Order Coryneliales 
Family Coryneliaceae  – 8 genera
Family Eremascaceae  – 2 genera
Subclass Eurotiomycetidae 
Order Arachnomycetales 
Family Arachnomycetaceae  – 2 genera
Order Eurotiales 
Family Aspergillaceae  (=Monascaceae ) – 14 genera
Family Elaphomycetaceae  – 2 genera
Family Penicillaginaceae  – 1 genus
Family Thermoascaceae  – 2 genera
Family Trichocomaceae  – 9 genera
Order Onygenales 
Family Ajellomycetaceae  – 7 genera
Family Arthrodermataceae  – 11 genera
Family Ascosphaeraceae  – 3 genera
Family Gymnoascaceae  – 11 genera
Family Nannizziopsidaceae  – 1 genus
Family Onygenaceae  – 34 genera
Family Spiromastigaceae  – 4 genera
Onygenales incertae sedis – 3 genera
Eurotiomycetidae incertae sedis – 5 genera
Subclass Mycocaliciomycetidae 
Order Mycocaliciales 
Family Mycocaliciaceae  (=Sphinctrinaceae ) – 7 genera
Subclass Sclerococcomycetidae 
Order Sclerococcales 
Family Dactylosporaceae  (=Sclerococcaceae ) – 7 genera
Only one genus, Neocladophialophora, remains incertae sedis within the class.

Nomenclature
The scientific classification for this particular class is particularly tricky, with one particular species having both the anamorph (asexual form), and teleomorph (sexual form) names used in reference to them. 
e.g. anamorph form = Penicillium; teleomorph form = Talaromyces or Eupenicillium.

Morphology
Many members (Eurotiales, Onygenales) produce an enclosed structure cleistothecium within which they produce their spores.

References

External links

Outline of Ascomycota - 2007

Eurotiomycetes
Fungus classes
Lichen classes
Taxa described in 1997